Aizat Airatovich Sadykov (born 25 June 1993) is a former Russian professional football player.

Club career
He made his Russian Football National League debut for FC KAMAZ Naberezhnye Chelny on 2 May 2012 in a game against FC Khimki.

Personal life
His younger brother Bulat Sadykov is also a footballer.

External links
 
 
 Career summary at sportbox.ru

1993 births
Living people
Russian footballers
Association football defenders
FC KAMAZ Naberezhnye Chelny players
FC Orenburg players
FC Zenit-Izhevsk players